Asalpha is a metro station on Line 1 of the Mumbai Metro in Mumbai, India. It was opened to the public on 8 June 2014. Asalpha's metro station is the third last station towards Ghatkopar in the Metro Line 1.

History 
This station had originally been named Subhash Nagar, despite the fact that it was not located near the Subhash Nagar area. Following appeals from local residents, the MMRDA decided to change the name of the station to Asalpha in December 2013. The next station (towards Ghatkopar), which had originally been named Asalpha, was subsequently renamed Jagruti Nagar.

Station layout

Facilities 
List of available ATM at Asalpha metro station are

Connections

Exits

See also 
Public transport in Mumbai
List of Mumbai Metro stations
List of rapid transit systems in India
List of Metro Systems

References

External links 

 The official site of Mumbai Metro
 UrbanRail.Net – descriptions of all metro systems in the world, each with a schematic map showing all stations.

Mumbai Metro stations
Railway stations in India opened in 2014
2014 establishments in Maharashtra